The Gymnasium am Ostring was the oldest gymnasium in Bochum. It was founded in 1860 and closed after the 2009-2010 school year.

The school was located in downtown Bochum, near the main train station.

In the 2005-2006 school year, there were 786 students and 55 teachers. In the early 80s, the school had over 1,000 students. The peak enrollment was 1,310 in the 1980-1981 school year.

In humanities tradition, the school offered Latin, ancient Greek, and Hebrew. The school also offered English, French, modern Greek, Italian, and Spanish.

In August 2010, the Gymnasium am Ostring merged with the Albert-Einstein-Schule to form the Neues Gymnasium Bochum, the new combined school's temporary name until a new one is selected. The school will relocate to the site of the former Albert-Einstein-Schule on October 22, 2012.

Notable alumni
Manfred Eigen, 1967 Nobel Prize laureate in chemistry
Herbert Grönemeyer, actor (Das Boot) and singer
Norbert Lammert, President (Speaker) of the Bundestag (the German parliament)

References

External links
 Official school homepage 

Schools in North Rhine-Westphalia
Defunct schools in Germany
Educational institutions established in 1860
Educational institutions disestablished in 2010
2010 disestablishments in Germany
1860 establishments in Germany